Gogitidze is a Georgian surname. It may refer to
Bakouri Gogitidze, Georgian mixed martial artist
Bakur Gogitidze (born 1973), Georgian wrestler
Megi Gogitidze (born 1989), Georgian singer-songwriter and composer

Georgian-language surnames
Surnames of Georgian origin